Graham Hurrell (born 7 May 1975) is a retired English badminton player. After retiring, he worked as coach at the Bourne-mouth David Lloyd Club. Currently he is working as a National Pathway Coach of badminton team of England and has coached players at all major events including Thomas Cup, Olympics and World Championships. In his playing years he also competed in World Championships and won 7 Caps for his country.

Achievements

IBF World Grand Prix 
The World Badminton Grand Prix sanctioned by International Badminton Federation (IBF) since 1983.

Men's doubles

IBF International 
Men's doubles

Mixed doubles

References

External links 
 
 

1975 births
Living people
English male badminton players